South Derbyshire is a local government district in Derbyshire, England. The population of the local authority at the 2011 Census was 94,611. It contains a third of the National Forest, and the council offices are in Swadlincote. The district also forms part of the wider Burton upon Trent and Swadlincote Green Belt, which covers the towns of Burton-upon-Trent in East Staffordshire and Swadlincote in South Derbyshire. The district is also landlocked between the districts of Derby, Derbyshire Dales, East Staffordshire, Erewash District, Lichfield District, North Warwickshire, North West Leicestershire and Tamworth. 

The district was formed on 1 April 1974 as a merger of the Swadlincote urban district along with Repton Rural District and part of South East Derbyshire Rural District.

Settlements
Settlements in the district include:
Aston-on-Trent
Barrow upon Trent, Boulton Moor, Bretby
Calke, Castle Gresley, Cauldwell, Church Gresley, Church Broughton, Coton in the Elms 
Chellaston Fields (excludes rest of Chellaston which falls under Derby.)
Egginton, Elvaston, Etwall
Hartshorne, Hatton, Hilton, Hollington
Ingleby
Kings Newton
Linton, Lullington
Melbourne (Town), Milton
Netherseal, Newton Solney Newhall
Overseal
Repton, Rosliston
Shardlow, Smisby, Stanton by Bridge, Stenson Fields, Swadlincote (Town), Swarkestone
Ticknall
Walton-on-Trent, Weston-on-Trent, Willington Woodville

Energy policy

In May 2006, a report commissioned by British Gas showed that housing in South Derbyshire produced the 19th highest average carbon emissions in the country at 6,929 kg of carbon dioxide per dwelling. As a way of helping to reduce these emissions, the local councils have since given out leaflets and flyers telling people information about climate change.

Population

Relative to Derbyshire, the East Midlands and England as a whole the population of South Derbyshire is expected to rise by 23% in forecasts from a 2005 population of 88,000 to a 2025 population of 108,600. Swadlincote is anticipated to absorb most of this expansion. No other district in Derbyshire is expected to grow at even half this rate. The figures for the East Midlands as whole over this time range is 10.5% with both Derbyshire and England as a whole being similar but less. Derby is forecast to grow by only 6%.

Council

Elections to the district are held every 4 years, with currently 36 councillors being elected to 15 wards.

Arms

See also
 List of civil parishes in South Derbyshire

References

External links

South Derbyshire District Council Official site
South Derbyshire Badgers Official set

 
Non-metropolitan districts of Derbyshire